The Unite Foundation is a UK registered charitable trust founded by student accommodation provider Unite Students in 2012.

The charity provides free university accommodation and a cost-of-living scholarship to young people who have earned a university place but who, for financial reasons, are unlikely to be able to take it up.

Particular emphasis is placed on assisting young people who have been through the UK Care System. It currently offers scholarships to 90 students studying in the 2014/15 academic year. In October 2014 the Unite Foundation announced it had secured an £8.5 million, five-year funding pledge from Unite Students which it claims "will mean about 300 more" scholars.

Operation
The Unite Foundation works in partnership with seven universities across England and Scotland. The universities themselves operate the admission process, while the Foundation sets the admission criteria and reviews acceptances.

All Unite Foundation Scholars are offered free accommodation in Unite Students properties for the duration of their studies. In addition, each receives an annual cost-of-living scholarship of £3,000, rising to £4,000 in London

Personnel
As of October 2014 the Chair is Jenny Shaw, who is also Head of Higher Education Engagement and Student Services at Unite Students. The six-strong Board of Trustees is made up of four senior Unite Students staff and two external post-holders. The Unite Foundation's patron is designer Wayne Hemingway MBE

Partner Universities
The following universities offer Unite Foundation Scholarships:

 De Montfort University
 King's College London
 Queen Mary University of London
 Sheffield Hallam University
 University of Bristol
 University of Edinburgh
 Liverpool John Moores University
London Metropolitan University

References

Charities based in Bristol
Organizations established in 2012
Youth charities based in the United Kingdom
2012 establishments in the United Kingdom